Giulio Fasolo (born 14 October 1998) is an Italian football player who plays for Serie D club A.C. Mestre.

Club career
He made his Serie B debut for Cittadella on 18 May 2017 in a game against Virtus Entella.

On 3 August 2019, he signed with Gozzano. On 23 January 2020, his contract with Gozzano was terminated by mutual consent. On the following day, he signed with Serie D club S.S.D. Pro Sesto. In the summer 2020, Fasolo moved to fellow league club A.C. Mestre.

References

External links
 

1998 births
Sportspeople from Vicenza
Living people
Italian footballers
Association football forwards
A.S. Cittadella players
Virtus Verona players
A.C. Gozzano players
S.S.D. Pro Sesto players
A.C. Mestre players
Serie B players
Serie C players
Serie D players
Footballers from Veneto